Triunia robusta, or glossy spice bush, is a shrub of the family Proteaceae native to Queensland.

References

Endemic flora of Queensland
robusta
Plants described in 1933